Cao Xie ( third century) was a prince in the state of Cao Wei in the Three Kingdoms period of China. He was a son of Cao Pi, the first emperor of Wei. His mother, whose maiden family name was Li (李), was a concubine of Cao Pi holding the rank of guiren (貴人; translated "Honoured Lady"). He died early and was posthumously honoured as Duke Shang of Jing (經殤公) in 231 by his half-brother, Cao Rui. In 234, Cao Rui posthumously promoted him to a prince under a new posthumous title: Prince Ai of Zan (贊哀王).

In 235, Cao Xie's only son, Cao Xun (曹尋), inherited the princedom posthumously awarded to his father, and became the Prince of Zan (贊王). In 239, the emperor Cao Fang increased the number of taxable households in Cao Xun's princedom by 500, bringing it up to a total of 3,000. When Cao Xun died in 249, he was posthumously honoured as "Prince Shang" (殤王). As he had no son to succeed him, his princedom was abolished.

See also
 Cao Wei family trees#Consorts Li, Su, Zhang, and Song
 Lists of people of the Three Kingdoms

References

 Chen, Shou (3rd century). Records of the Three Kingdoms (Sanguozhi).

Year of birth unknown
Year of death unknown
Cao Wei imperial princes